Varaz Trdat - was the Mihranid king of Caucasian Albania from 670 to 705. 

He was kept as prisoner in Constantinople from 694 until 699. In his absence, his queen Sparama and regent prince Shero served as regents but became involved in conflict. Shero was prisoned by Arabs when Trdat came back to throne. 

After his death, kingdom abolished and Mihranids stood as princes of Gardman.

References

7th-century monarchs in Asia
8th-century monarchs in Asia
7th-century Iranian people
Mihranids
8th-century Iranian people
Asian kings
European kings